Righ may be:
Gaelic for "king", see Rí
Oued Righ